Calephelis virginiensis, the little metalmark, is a species of metalmark in the butterfly family Riodinidae. It is found in North America.

The MONA or Hodges number for Calephelis virginiensis is 4386.

References

Further reading

External links

 

Riodinini
Articles created by Qbugbot
Butterflies described in 1832